Lichenaula lichenea is a species of moth of the family Xyloryctidae. It is known in Australia from the Australian Capital Territory, New South Wales and Queensland.

Adults are on wing in March and April.

Original description

Food plants
The larvae feed on lichens growing on fences and rocks, sheltering in a gallery of silk and refuse particles

References

Lichenaula
Moths described in 1890